Ivo Hajnal (born 1961 in Zürich) is a Swiss–Austrian philologist and linguist, specialized in Indo-European studies and Mycenaean Greek.

Hajnal studied Indo-European linguistics and philology at the University of Zurich, and received his PhD in 1990 for a dissertation on the Mycenaean  Greek case system. His Habilitation (completed in 1995) focused on ancient Lycian.

Following positions in Berlin and Münster, Hajnal was appointed a full professor in ancient linguistics at the University of Innsbruck in 2001. He was later made Chairman of the Senate in 2004.

Hajnal is a member of the Luwian Studies foundation board.

References

External links
 Webpage of Hajnal on academia.edu

1961 births
Living people
Linguists from Switzerland
Linguists of Indo-European languages
People from Zürich
University of Zurich alumni
Academic staff of the University of Innsbruck